Greatest Hits is a branding used by Sony Interactive Entertainment  for discounted reprints of PlayStation video games. The branding is used for reprints of popular, top-selling games for each console in the PlayStation family, which are deliberately sold with a lower MSRP than the original production runs of a game, and feature special branding—colored in red since PlayStation 2—on their box art, as well as red-colored cases on PlayStation Portable, PlayStation Vita, PlayStation 3 and PlayStation 4 releases (instead of the traditional clear or blue-colored casing).

Equivalent programs exist in Europe and Oceania (as "Essentials"), Japan and select Asian countries (as "The Best"), South Korea (as "BigHit"), and in South America (as "Favoritos"). PlayStation Hits is used as the branding label for PlayStation 4 games in North America, Brazil, Europe, Oceania, Japan, and select Asian countries.

History
When Sony introduced the program for PlayStation in March 1997, games could become Greatest Hits titles after selling at least 150,000 copies and being on the market for at least a year. Minimum sales required eventually rose to 250,000. When the program came to PlayStation 2 in 2002, games could become Greatest Hits titles after selling at least 400,000 copies and being on the market for at least one year. Suggested retail prices of Greatest Hits titles were initially $24.99, but they now typically retail for $19.99. Though Sony-developed games are virtually guaranteed to eventually become Greatest Hits titles by meeting their sales and age requirements, 3rd party developers are not required to release their titles with a Greatest Hits label even if said titles meet the criteria. Additionally, Sony allows 3rd party developers some flexibility in the pricing of their own Greatest Hits titles, but most of them stick to the agreed-upon suggested retail price. Games that are multi-million sellers may become Greatest Hits titles much later than 9 months to maximize profits. It is also a common practice for a game to re-release on the Greatest Hits label at a close proximity to the release of that game's sequel or follow-up.

In 2006, Sony extended the Greatest Hits program to the PlayStation Portable.  To qualify, a title must be on the market for at least 9 months and have sold 250,000 copies or more. The Greatest Hits price for PlayStation Portable games typically begins at $19.99.

On July 28, 2008, the program was introduced on the PlayStation 3. A PlayStation 3 game must be on the market for 10 months and sell at least 500,000 copies to meet the Greatest Hits criteria. PlayStation 3 Greatest Hits titles currently sell at $29.99.

Sony announced the launch of Greatest Hits on PlayStation 4 in Mexico, Canada, and the United States, renamed PlayStation Hits, on June 19, 2018. As with PS3 Greatest Hits releases, they feature red-colored packaging and a red banner on their box art. PlayStation Hits pricing will also be available on PlayStation Store.

"Special edition" Greatest Hits

While Greatest Hits titles are usually just a re-release of the original game with altered packaging and a lower price, occasionally a game is given a "special edition" of its original version, released under the Greatest Hits label. Usually these additions are small bonuses, such as the inclusion of bugfixes, new game demos or soundtrack CDs, or slight improvements such as adding analog control or vibration functionality to games that did not have these features in their original releases. Occasionally, significant changes are implemented into the game. Noteworthy examples of this are the Greatest Hits special editions of Devil May Cry 3: Dante's Awakening, Dragon Ball Z: Budokai 3, Heavy Rain, Jet Moto 2, The Lost World: Jurassic Park, Midnight Club 3: DUB Edition, Midnight Club Los Angeles, Silent Hill 2, Virtua Fighter 4: Evolution, and Spyro: Year of the Dragon, which were enhanced significantly from their original releases with added characters, levels, modes, features, etc.

List of official Greatest Hits titles

PlayStation
The following titles have been released on the Greatest Hits label for PlayStation.

007: Tomorrow Never Dies
007: The World Is Not Enough
1Xtreme
2Xtreme
A Bug's Life
Activision Classics
Air Combat
Alien Trilogy
Andretti Racing
Ape Escape
Army Men 3D
Army Men: Air Attack
Asteroids
Battle Arena Toshinden
Casper
Castlevania: Symphony of the Night
Chrono Cross
Cool Boarders 2
Cool Boarders 3
Cool Boarders 4
Crash Bandicoot
Crash Bandicoot 2: Cortex Strikes Back
Crash Bandicoot: Warped
Crash Bash
Crash Team Racing
Croc: Legend of the Gobbos
Dance Dance Revolution Konamix
Dave Mirra Freestyle BMX
Destruction Derby
Destruction Derby 2
Die Hard Trilogy
Digimon Digital Card Battle
Digimon Rumble Arena
Digimon World
Digimon World 2
Digimon World 3
Dino Crisis
Disney's Tarzan
Doom
Dragon Ball Z: Ultimate Battle 22
Driver
Driver 2
Duke Nukem: Time to Kill
The Dukes of Hazzard: Racing for Home
Fighting Force
Final Fantasy VII
Final Fantasy VIII
Final Fantasy IX
Final Fantasy Anthology
Final Fantasy Chronicles
Final Fantasy Origins
Final Fantasy Tactics
Formula 1
Frogger
Frogger 2: Swampy's Revenge
Gran Turismo
Gran Turismo 2
Grand Theft Auto
Grand Theft Auto 2
Harry Potter and the Philosopher's Stone

Hot Wheels Turbo Racing
Jeremy McGrath SuperCross '98
Jet Moto
Jet Moto 2: Championship Edition
Legacy of Kain: Soul Reaver
The Legend of Dragoon
Loaded
The Lost World: Jurassic Park – Special Edition
Madden NFL 98
Mat Hoffman's Pro BMX
Medal of Honor
Medal of Honor: Underground
Mega Man 8
Mega Man Legends
Mega Man X4
Metal Gear Solid
Monopoly
Monsters, Inc. Scream Team
Mortal Kombat Trilogy
Mortal Kombat 4
Namco Museum Vol. 1
Namco Museum Vol. 3
NASCAR 98
NASCAR 99
The Need for Speed
Need for Speed II
Need for Speed III: Hot Pursuit
Need for Speed: High Stakes
NFL Blitz
NFL Blitz 2000
NFL GameDay
NFL GameDay '97
NHL 98
NHL FaceOff
NHL FaceOff '97
Nuclear Strike
Oddworld: Abe's Oddysee
Pac-Man World
Parasite Eve
Rampage World Tour
Rayman
Ready 2 Rumble Boxing
Reel Fishing
Resident Evil: Director's Cut (Dual Shock Version)
Resident Evil 2 (Dual Shock Version)
Resident Evil 3: Nemesis
Ridge Racer
Road Rash
Road Rash 3D 
Rocket Power: Team Rocket Rescue
Rugrats: Search for Reptar
Scooby-Doo and the Cyber Chase
Silent Hill
SimCity 2000
Sled Storm
Soul Blade
Soviet Strike
Spider-Man
Spider-Man 2 – Enter: Electro
SpongeBob SquarePants: SuperSponge

Spyro the Dragon
Spyro 2: Ripto's Rage!
Spyro: Year of the Dragon
Star Wars: Dark Forces
Star Wars: Episode I – Jedi Power Battles
Star Wars: Episode I – The Phantom Menace
Star Wars: Rebel Assault II – The Hidden Empire
Street Fighter Alpha 3
Stuart Little 2
Syphon Filter
Syphon Filter 2
Syphon Filter 3
Tekken
Tekken 2
Tekken 3
Ten Pin Alley
Tenchu: Stealth Assassins
Tenchu 2: Birth of the Stealth Assassins
Test Drive 4
Test Drive 5
Test Drive: Off-Road
Tetris Plus
TNN Motorsports Hardcore 4x4
Tom Clancy's Rainbow Six
Tomb Raider
Tomb Raider II
Tomb Raider III: Adventures of Lara Croft
Tomb Raider: The Last Revelation
Tony Hawk's Pro Skater
Tony Hawk's Pro Skater 2
Tony Hawk's Pro Skater 3
Tony Hawk's Pro Skater 4
Toy Story 2: Buzz Lightyear to the Rescue
Triple Play 98
Triple Play 2001
Twisted Metal
Twisted Metal 2
Twisted Metal III
Twisted Metal 4
Vagrant Story
Vigilante 8
Vigilante 8: 2nd Offense
Warhawk
WCW Nitro
WCW vs. the World
Wheel of Fortune
Who Wants to Be a Millionaire: 2nd Edition
WipEout
WWF SmackDown!
WWF SmackDown! 2: Know Your Role
WWF War Zone
WWF WrestleMania: The Arcade Game
X-Men: Mutant Academy
Xenogears

PlayStation 2

The following titles have been released on the Greatest Hits label for PlayStation 2.

007: Agent Under Fire
007: Everything or Nothing
007: Nightfire
24: The Game
50 Cent: Bulletproof
Ace Combat 04: Shattered Skies
Ace Combat 5: The Unsung War
American Chopper
American Chopper 2: Full Throttle
ATV Offroad Fury
ATV Offroad Fury 2
ATV Offroad Fury 3
ATV Offroad Fury 4
Avatar: The Last Airbender
Baldur's Gate: Dark Alliance
Battlefield 2: Modern Combat
Ben 10: Alien Force
Ben 10: Protector of Earth
Beyond Good & Evil
Black
Blitz: The League
Blowout
Brothers in Arms: Road to Hill 30
Bully
Burnout
Burnout 2: Point of Impact
Burnout 3: Takedown
Burnout Revenge
Cabela's Big Game Hunter
Cabela's Dangerous Hunts
Cabela's Deer Hunt: 2004 Season
Call of Duty: Finest Hour
Call of Duty 2: Big Red One
Call of Duty 3 Special Edition
Call of Duty: World at War – Final Fronts
Cars
Champions of Norrath
Charlie and the Chocolate Factory
Chicken Little
Conflict: Desert Storm
Conflict: Desert Storm II - Back to Baghdad
Crash Bandicoot: The Wrath of Cortex
Crash Nitro Kart
Crash Tag Team Racing
Crazy Taxi
Dance Dance Revolution Extreme
Dark Cloud
Dark Cloud 2
Dave Mirra Freestyle BMX 2
DDRMAX2 Dance Dance Revolution
Dead to Rights
Def Jam: Fight for NY
Def Jam Vendetta
Destroy All Humans!
Destroy All Humans! 2
Devil May Cry
Devil May Cry 2
Devil May Cry 3: Dante's Awakening Special Edition
Dirge of Cerberus: Final Fantasy VII
Disgaea: Hour of Darkness
Dragon Ball Z: Budokai
Dragon Ball Z: Budokai 2
Dragon Ball Z: Budokai 3
Dragon Ball Z: Budokai Tenkaichi
Dragon Ball Z: Budokai Tenkaichi 2
Dragon Ball Z: Budokai Tenkaichi 3
Dragon Quest VIII: Journey of the Cursed King
Driv3r
Dynasty Warriors 4
Dynasty Warriors 4: Empires
Ed, Edd n Eddy: The Mis-Edventures
Enter the Matrix
Fantastic 4
Fight Night 2004
Fight Night Round 2
Fight Night Round 3
Final Fantasy X
Final Fantasy X-2
Final Fantasy XII
Finding Nemo
FlatOut
FlatOut 2
Freekstyle
Ghost Rider
God of War
God of War II
GoldenEye: Rogue Agent
Gran Turismo 3: A-spec
Gran Turismo 4
Grand Theft Auto III
Grand Theft Auto: San Andreas
Grand Theft Auto: Vice City
Guitar Hero
Guitar Hero II
Guitar Hero III: Legends of Rock
Guitar Hero Encore: Rocks the 80s
Harry Potter and the Chamber of Secrets
Harry Potter and the Goblet of Fire
Harry Potter and the Order of the Phoenix
Harry Potter and the Prisoner of Azkaban
Harry Potter: Quidditch World Cup
High School Musical 3: Senior Year Dance
Hitman 2: Silent Assassin
Hitman: Contracts
Hot Shots Golf 3
Hot Shots Golf Fore!
Iron Man
Jak and Daxter: The Precursor Legacy
Jak II

Jak 3
Jak X: Combat Racing
Jaws Unleashed
Jet Li: Rise to Honor
Juiced
Kill.switch
Killzone
Kingdom Hearts
Kingdom Hearts II
Kingdom Hearts Re:Chain of Memories
Legacy of Kain: Blood Omen 2
Legacy of Kain: Soul Reaver 2
Lego Batman: The Videogame
Lego Indiana Jones: The Original Adventures
Lego Star Wars: The Video Game
Lego Star Wars II: The Original Trilogy
Madagascar
Madden NFL 12
Manhunt
Marvel Nemesis: Rise of the Imperfects
Marvel: Ultimate Alliance
Max Payne
Max Payne 2: The Fall of Max Payne
Maximo: Ghosts to Glory
Maximo vs. Army of Zin
Medal of Honor: European Assault
Medal of Honor: Frontline
Medal of Honor: Rising Sun
Medal of Honor: Vanguard
Mercenaries: Playground of Destruction
Metal Gear Solid 2: Sons of Liberty
Metal Gear Solid 3: Snake Eater
Midnight Club: Street Racing
Midnight Club II
Midnight Club 3: DUB Edition Remix
Mortal Kombat: Deadly Alliance
Mortal Kombat: Deception
Mortal Kombat: Armageddon
Mortal Kombat: Shaolin Monks
MVP Baseball 2005
MX Unleashed
MX vs. ATV Unleashed
MX vs. ATV Untamed
Myst III: Exile
Namco Museum
Namco Museum: 50th Anniversary
Nanobreaker
Naruto: Uzumaki Chronicles
Naruto: Ultimate Ninja
Naruto: Ultimate Ninja 2
NASCAR Thunder 2003
NASCAR Thunder 2004
NBA 2K2
NBA Ballers
NBA Street
NBA Street Vol. 2
NBA Street V3
Need for Speed: Carbon
Need for Speed: Hot Pursuit 2
Need for Speed: Most Wanted
Need for Speed: ProStreet
Need for Speed: Undercover
Need for Speed: Underground
Need for Speed: Underground 2
NFL 2K2
NFL Street
NFL Street 2
NFL Street 3
Nicktoons Unite!
Odin Sphere
Ōkami
Onimusha: Warlords
Onimusha 2: Samurai's Destiny
Over the Hedge
Pac-Man World 2
Pinball: Hall of Fame - The Gottlieb Collection
Pirates of the Caribbean: The Legend of Jack Sparrow
Power Rangers: Dino Thunder
Prince of Persia: The Sands of Time
Prince of Persia: The Two Thrones
Prince of Persia: Warrior Within
Ratatouille
Ratchet & Clank
Ratchet & Clank: Going Commando
Ratchet & Clank: Up Your Arsenal
Ratchet: Deadlocked
Rayman 2: Revolution
Rayman 3: Hoodlum Havoc
Rayman Arena
RC Revenge Pro
Red Dead Revolver
Red Faction
Red Faction II
Resident Evil 4
Resident Evil – Code: Veronica X
Resident Evil Outbreak
Robots
Rock Band - Complete Edition
Scarface: The World Is Yours
Scooby-Doo! Night of 100 Frights
Sengoku Basara 2
Sengoku Basara 2: Heroes
Shadow of the Colossus
Shadow the Hedgehog
Shark Tale
Shrek 2
Shrek the Third
Silent Hill 2: Director's Cut
Sly Cooper and the Thievius Raccoonus
Sly 2: Band of Thieves
Sly 3: Honor Among Thieves
Smuggler's Run
SOCOM U.S. Navy SEALs

SOCOM II U.S. Navy SEALs
SOCOM 3 U.S. Navy SEALs
SOCOM U.S. Navy SEALs: Combined Assault
Sonic Heroes
Sonic Mega Collection Plus
Sonic Riders
Soulcalibur II
Soulcalibur III
Spider-Man
Spider-Man 2
Spider-Man 3
Spider-Man: Friend or Foe
SpongeBob SquarePants: Battle for Bikini Bottom
SpongeBob SquarePants: Creature from the Krusty Krab
SpongeBob SquarePants: Lights, Camera, Pants!
SpongeBob SquarePants: Revenge of the Flying Dutchman
SpongeBob's Atlantis SquarePantis
Spy Hunter
Spyro: Enter the Dragonfly
SSX
SSX Tricky
SSX 3
Star Ocean: Till the End of Time
Star Wars: Battlefront
Star Wars: Battlefront II
Star Wars: Bounty Hunter
Star Wars Episode III: Revenge of the Sith
Star Wars: Starfighter
Star Wars: The Force Unleashed
State of Emergency
Street Hoops
Stuntman
Syphon Filter: The Omega Strain
Tak and the Power of Juju
Tekken 4
Tekken 5
Tekken Tag Tournament
Tenchu: Wrath of Heaven
Test Drive
The Chronicles of Narnia: The Lion, the Witch and the Wardrobe
The Getaway
The Godfather: The Game
The Incredible Hulk: Ultimate Destruction
The Incredibles
The Legend of Spyro: A New Beginning
The Lord of the Rings: The Two Towers
The Lord of the Rings: The Return of the King
The Lord of the Rings: The Third Age
The Simpsons Game
The Simpsons Hit and Run
The Simpsons: Road Rage
The Sims
The Sims 2
The Sims 2: Pets
The Sims Bustin' Out
The SpongeBob SquarePants Movie
The Thing (video game)
The Urbz: Sims in the City
The Warriors
Thrillville
TimeSplitters 2
TMNT
Tom Clancy's Ghost Recon
Tom Clancy's Ghost Recon 2
Tom Clancy's Ghost Recon: Jungle Storm
Tom Clancy's Ghost Recon Advanced Warfighter
Tom Clancy's Rainbow Six 3
Tom Clancy's Splinter Cell
Tom Clancy's Splinter Cell: Pandora Tomorrow
Tom Clancy's Splinter Cell: Chaos Theory
Tomb Raider: The Angel of Darkness
Tomb Raider: Legend
Tony Hawk's American Wasteland
Tony Hawk's Pro Skater 3
Tony Hawk's Pro Skater 4
Tony Hawk's Project 8
Tony Hawk's Proving Ground
Tony Hawk's Underground
Tony Hawk's Underground 2
Tourist Trophy
Transformers: The Game
True Crime: Streets of LA
Twisted Metal: Black
Ty the Tasmanian Tiger
Ultimate Spider-Man
Valkyrie Profile 2: Silmeria
Virtua Fighter 4
Virtua Fighter 4: Evolution
Wallace and Gromit: The Curse of the Were-Rabbit
Wallace and Gromit in Project Zoo
We Love Katamari
World Championship Poker
World Championship Poker 2
World Series of Poker
WWE SmackDown! vs. Raw
WWE SmackDown! vs. Raw 2006
WWE SmackDown vs. Raw 2007
WWE SmackDown vs. Raw 2008
WWE SmackDown vs. Raw 2009
WWE SmackDown vs. Raw 2010
WWE SmackDown vs. Raw 2011
WWF SmackDown! Just Bring It
WWE SmackDown! Shut Your Mouth
WWE SmackDown! Here Comes the Pain
Xenosaga Episode I: Der Wille zur Macht
X-Men Legends
X-Men Legends II: Rise of Apocalypse
Yu-Gi-Oh! The Duelists of the Roses

PlayStation 3

The following titles have been released on the Greatest Hits label for PlayStation 3.

007: Quantum of Solace
Army of Two
Army of Two: The 40th Day
Assassin's Creed
Assassin's Creed II
Assassin's Creed III
Assassin's Creed: Brotherhood
Assassin's Creed: Revelations
Assassin's Creed: Rogue
Bakugan: Battle Brawlers
Batman: Arkham Asylum Game of the Year Edition
Batman: Arkham City Game of the Year Edition
Battlefield: Bad Company
Battlefield: Bad Company 2
Battlefield 3
BioShock
BioShock 2
BioShock Infinite
Borderlands
Borderlands: Game of the Year Edition
Borderlands 2
Burnout Paradise
Call of Duty 3
Call of Duty: Black Ops
Call of Duty: Black Ops II
Call of Duty 4: Modern Warfare
Call of Duty: Modern Warfare 2
Call of Duty: World at War
Crysis 2
Dark Souls
Dark Souls II: Scholar Of The First Sin
Darksiders
Dead Island
Dead Island: Game of the Year Edition
Dead Rising 2
Dead Space
Dead Space 2
Dead Space 3
Demon's Souls
Devil May Cry 4
Dishonored
Dishonored: Game of the Year Edition
The Elder Scrolls IV: Oblivion – Game of the Year Edition
The Elder Scrolls V: Skyrim	
[[The Elder Scrolls V: Skyrim|The Elder Scrolls V: Skyrim – Legendary Edition]]Fallout 3Fallout 3: Game of the Year EditionFallout: New Vegas – Ultimate EditionFar Cry 3Far Cry 4Fight Night ChampionFight Night Round 3Fight Night Round 4Final Fantasy XIIIGod of War CollectionGod of War IIIGran Turismo 5: PrologueGrand Theft Auto: San AndreasGrand Theft Auto VHeavenly SwordHeavy RainHeavy Rain: Director's CutHitman: AbsolutionInfamousInjustice: Gods Among Us – Ultimate EditionKane & Lynch: Dead MenKillzone 2Killzone 3Kingdom Hearts HD 1.5 RemixKingdom Hearts HD 2.5 RemixKingdoms of Amalur: ReckoningL.A. NoireLego Batman 2: DC Super HeroesLego Marvel Super HeroesLego The Lord of the Rings: The Video GameLego Star Wars: The Complete SagaLego Star Wars III: The Clone WarsLego Harry Potter: Years 1–4Lego Indiana Jones: The Original AdventuresLego Indiana Jones 2: The Adventure ContinuesLittleBigPlanet: Game of the Year EditionMAGMarvel: Ultimate AllianceMax Payne 3Medal of HonorMedal of Honor: WarfighterMetal Gear Solid 4: Guns of the PatriotsMidnight Club: Los Angeles – Complete EditionModNation RacersMortal Kombat vs. DC UniverseMortal Kombat: Komplete EditionMotorStormMotorStorm: Pacific RiftMotorStorm: ApocalypseNaruto Shippuden: Ultimate Ninja Storm 3Need for Speed: CarbonNeed for Speed: Hot PursuitNeed for Speed: Most WantedNeed for Speed: ProStreetNeed for Speed: RivalsNeed for Speed: ShiftNeed for Speed: UndercoverNeed for Speed: The RunNi No Kuni: Wrath of the White WitchNinja Gaiden: SigmaPortal 2Prince of PersiaPro Evolution Soccer 2013RageRatchet & Clank Future: Tools of DestructionRatchet & Clank Future: A Crack in TimeRed Dead RedemptionRed Dead Redemption: Game of the Year EditionResident Evil 5Resident Evil 5: Gold EditionResident Evil 6Resident Evil: Operation Raccoon City Resistance: Fall of ManResistance 2Resistance Dual PackRock Band - Complete EditionRock Band 2 - Premium EditionRock Band 3 - Ultimate EditionSaints Row 2Saints Row: The ThirdSaints Row IVSaints Row IV National Treasure EditionShift 2: UnleashedSid Meier's Civilization RevolutionThe Sims 3Skate 3Sniper: Ghost WarriorSOCOM U.S. Navy SEALs: ConfrontationSOCOM 4 U.S. Navy SEALsSonic's Ultimate Genesis CollectionSonic GenerationsSonic UnleashedSoulcalibur IVSoulcalibur VSouth Park: The Stick of TruthStar Wars: The Force UnleashedStar Wars: The Force Unleashed IIStreet Fighter IVStreet Fighter X TekkenSuper Street Fighter IVSuper Street Fighter IV Arcade EditionTekken 6Tom Clancy's Ghost Recon Advanced Warfighter 2Tom Clancy's Ghost Recon Future SoldierTom Clancy's Rainbow Six: VegasTom Clancy's Rainbow Six: Vegas 2Tom Clancy's Splinter Cell: Double AgentTom Clancy's Splinter Cell: BlacklistTomb RaiderUFC 2009 UndisputedUFC Undisputed 2010UFC Undisputed 3Uncharted: Drake's FortuneUncharted 2: Among Thieves – GOTY EditionUncharted Dual PackVirtua Fighter 5WarhawkWatch DogsWipeout HD FuryWWE Smackdown vs. Raw 2008WWE SmackDown vs. Raw 2009WWE SmackDown vs. Raw 2010WWE 12PlayStation Portable
The following titles have been released on the Greatest Hits label for PlayStation Portable.300: March to GloryAssassin's Creed: BloodlinesApe Escape: On the LooseATV Offroad Fury: Blazin' TrailsBurnout LegendsCarsCastlevania: The Dracula X ChroniclesCoded ArmsCrisis Core: Final Fantasy VIIDaxterDissidia: Final FantasyDragon Ball Z: Shin BudokaiFight Night Round 3Final Fantasy Tactics: The War of the LionsGod of War: Chains of OlympusGran TurismoGrand Theft Auto: Chinatown WarsGrand Theft Auto: Liberty City StoriesGrand Theft Auto: Vice City StoriesHot Shots Golf: Open TeeIron ManKillzone: LiberationLego Star Wars II: The Original TrilogyLego Indiana Jones: The Original AdventuresLego Batman: The VideogameLittleBigPlanetMarvel: Ultimate AllianceMedal of Honor: HeroesMedal of Honor: Heroes 2Metal Gear Solid: Peace WalkerMetal Gear Solid: Portable OpsMidnight Club 3: DUB EditionMidnight Club: L.A. RemixMortal Kombat: UnchainedMX vs. ATV: UntamedNamco Museum Battle CollectionNaruto: Ultimate Ninja HeroesNeed for Speed Carbon: Own the CityNeed for Speed: Most Wanted 5–1–0Need for Speed: ProStreetNeed for Speed Underground: RivalsPataponRatchet & Clank: Size MattersResistance: RetributionRidge RacerScarface: Money. Power. Respect.Secret Agent ClankSOCOM U.S. Navy SEALs: Fireteam BravoSOCOM U.S. Navy SEALs: Fireteam Bravo 2SOCOM U.S. Navy SEALs: Tactical StrikeSonic RivalsSonic Rivals 2SpongeBob SquarePants: The Yellow AvengerStar Wars: Battlefront IIStar Wars Battlefront: Renegade SquadronStar Wars: The Force UnleashedSyphon Filter: Dark MirrorTekken: Dark ResurrectionThe Simpsons GameThrillvilleThrillville: Off the RailsTom Clancy's Ghost Recon Advanced Warfighter 2Tom Clancy's Rainbow Six: VegasTony Hawk's Underground 2 RemixTony Hawk's Project 8Transformers: The GameTwisted Metal: Head-OnUntold Legends: Brotherhood of the BladeWipeout PureWWE SmackDown! vs. Raw 2006WWE SmackDown vs. Raw 2007WWE SmackDown vs. Raw 2008WWE SmackDown vs. Raw 2009WWE SmackDown vs. Raw 2010WWE SmackDown vs. Raw 2011 PlayStation 4 
The following list shows only PlayStation Hits titles for North America, Europe, Oceania, and Asia.

 Assassin's Creed IV: Black Flag (Europe & Asia Only)  Assassin's Creed: Syndicate Special Edition (Asia Only)  Assassin's Creed: The Ezio Collection (Asia Only) Assassin's Creed: Unity (Asia Only) Batman: Arkham Knight Battlefield 1 Battlefield 4 Battlefield Hardline Bloodborne Crash Bandicoot: N. Sane Trilogy Crash Bandicoot 4: It's About Time Crash Team Racing: Nitro-Fueled The Crew Death Stranding  Destiny - The Collection (Asia Only) Devil May Cry 4 Special Edition (Asia Only) Disgaea 5 (Asia Only) DOOM Dragon Age: Inquisition Dragon Ball Xenoverse (Europe Only) Dragon Quest Builders (Asia Only) Dragon Quest Heroes II (Asia Only) Dragon Quest Heroes: The World Tree's Woe and the Blight Below Dreams (video game) Driveclub Dying Light: The Following - Enhanced Edition Dynasty Warriors 8: Xtreme Legends Complete Edition Dynasty Warriors 9 EA Sports UFC 2 EA Sports UFC 3 Earth Defense Force 4.1: The Shadow of New Despair Everybody's Golf (Asia Only) The Evil Within (Asia Only) F1 2015 (Asia Only) Far Cry 4 Far Cry: Primal (Asia Only) Final Fantasy Type-0 HD (Asia Only) Final Fantasy X/X-2 HD Remaster (Asia Only) Fist of the North Star: Lost Paradise Friday the 13th: The Game  Gallian Chronicles Remaster (Asia Only)  God of War III Remastered God of War Gran Turismo Sport Gravity Rush 2 (Asia Only) Gravity Rush Remastered (Asia Only) Horizon Zero Dawn: Complete Edition  inFAMOUS: First Light (Asia Only)  inFAMOUS : Second Son Injustice: Gods Among Us - Ultimate Edition Injustice 2 Just Dance 2014 (Asia Only) Just Dance 2015 (Asia Only) Just Dance 2016 (Asia Only) Just Dance 2017 (Asia Only) Killzone: Shadow Fall  Knack (Asia Only) Knack 2 (Asia Only) The Last Guardian (Asia Only) The Last of Us Remastered LEGO Jurassic World LEGO Marvel Super Heroes LEGO Worlds LittleBigPlanet 3 Metal Gear Solid V: The Definitive Experience Middle-earth: Shadow of Mordor - Game of the Year Edition Monster Hunter: World Mortal Kombat X Naruto Shippuden: Ultimate Ninja Storm 4 (Europe Only) Need for Speed Need for Speed Payback Need for Speed Rivals Nioh One Piece: Pirate Warriors 3 (Europe Only) The Order: 1886 (Asia Only) Persona 5 Plants vs. Zombies: Garden Warfare 2 Project CARS Ratchet & Clank Rayman Legends Resident Evil 6 Resident Evil 7: Biohazard  Sengoku Basara 4: Sumeragi (Asia Only)  Sleeping Dogs Definitive Edition (Asia Only) Spyro Reignited Trilogy Star Wars Battlefront Star Wars Battlefront II Street Fighter V Tales of Berseria Tearaway Unfolded (Asia Only) Terraria Tom Clancy's Rainbow Six: Siege (Asia Only) Tom Clancy's The Division Tomb Raider: Definitive Edition (Asia Only) Uncharted: The Nathan Drake Collection Uncharted 4: A Thief's End Uncharted: The Lost Legacy Until Dawn  Watch Dogs (Europe & Asia Only)  Watch Dogs Complete Edition (Europe & Asia Only) World Soccer Winning Eleven 2015 (Asia Only)  World Soccer Winning Eleven 2017 (Asia Only) Yakuza 0 Yakuza Kiwami Yakuza Kiwami 2 Yakuza 6: The Song of Life''

See also
Sega All Stars
Nintendo Selects
Xbox Platinum Hits

References

External links

Greatest Hits games
 
 
 
 
 
PlayStation (brand)
PlayStation (brand)-related lists